L-event is an EP by electronic music duo Autechre, released on Warp Records on 28 October 2013. The EP is a companion to Autechre's double album Exai, which was released earlier in the same year.

Release
Like Exai, L-event features album artwork and packaging by The Designer's Republic. It was released on 28 October 2013 as a CD and LP, accompanied with either a downloadable .mp3 or .WAV version of the album when purchased from Bleep.com. On 11 October 2013, the digital version of the EP was released, with it streaming on "corrupted" versions of certain websites including Telegraph, Ableton, Bloomberg News, CBS News, Huffington Post and Warp Record's own site, with the pages distorting and the images being replaced with the L-event album cover.

Reception

Andy Kellman of AllMusic described L-event as some of Autechre's "most direct, least complex output", but said it was just as interesting as some of their more complicated works.

Track listing

Release history

References

External links
 Official Minisite
 L-event on Bleep.com

2013 EPs
Autechre EPs
Warp (record label) EPs
Albums with cover art by The Designers Republic